Automatic Writing is the debut studio album by American experimental rock band Ataxia, released on August 10, 2004 on Record Collection. Ataxia consisted of Red Hot Chili Peppers guitarist John Frusciante, Joe Lally of Fugazi, and Josh Klinghoffer, Frusciante's subsequent successor in the Red Hot Chili Peppers.

The band recorded 10 songs, approximately 80 minutes of content, over a two-week period, and played two live shows in a matter of four days. A second album, entitled AW II, was released on May 29, 2007 with the remaining five tracks recorded during this session.

The vinyl edition of the record saw a repressing from Record Collection on December 11, 2012.  These reissued records are 180 gram and come with a download of choice between MP3 and WAV formats of the album.

Regarding this release, Frusciante noted, "If you like me cause you saw me live, and I was beating the fuck out of my guitar, then this record - which is a collaboration with Josh Klinghoffer and Joe Lally - will give you what you're looking for. If you don't care about song structure, and you want powerful music with fucked-up guitar-playing and songs that are really long, this record is the one."

Track listing

Personnel 
The following people contributed to Automatic Writing:

Band 
 John Frusciante – guitar, synthesizers, vocals ("Dust", "The Sides", "Another" and "Addition")
 Joe Lally – bass, vocals ("Montreal")
 Josh Klinghoffer – drums, synthesizers, vocals ("Another")

Recording personnel 
 John Frusciante – producer
 Ryan Hewitt – engineer, mixing
 Ryan Castle – assistant
 Bernie Grundman – mastering

Artwork 
 Lola Montes – photography
 Mike Piscitelli – design
 John Frusciante – design

References 

John Frusciante albums
2004 albums